Dale Campbell (born 1954) is a Canadian First Nations carver from the Tahltan nation of northern British Columbia.

Early life and education
Dale Campbell was born in Prince Rupert, British Columbia, in 1954.  Her ancestry is Tahltan from Telegraph Creek.  She is of the Wolf clan.

In 1972 Campbell began an apprenticeship with the Tahltan carver Dempsey Bob and has also worked with the Haida carver Freda Diesing.

Totem poles
She specializes in carving totem poles and masks, including a 1982 totem pole carved for the Museum of Northern British Columbia in Prince Rupert.

Bibliography

 Jensen, Doreen, and Polly Sargent (1986) Robes of Power: Totem Poles on Cloth.  Vancouver: University of British Columbia Press.

1954 births
Living people
20th-century First Nations sculptors
Artists from British Columbia
Canadian women artists
Canadian woodcarvers
First Nations woodcarvers
People from Prince Rupert, British Columbia
People from the Regional District of Kitimat–Stikine
Tahltan people
Women woodcarvers
20th-century Canadian women artists
First Nations women artists